Men in Black (stylized as MIB: Men in Black) is a 1997 American science fiction action comedy film based on the comic series of a similar name by Marvel Comics. The film was directed by Barry Sonnenfeld, written by Ed Solomon, and is the first installment in the Men in Black franchise. It stars Tommy Lee Jones, Will Smith, Linda Fiorentino, Vincent D'Onofrio, and Rip Torn. In the film, Kevin Brown / Agent K (Jones) and James Darrell Edwards III / Agent J (Smith) investigate a series of seemingly unrelated criminal incidents related to the extraterrestrial lifeforms which live in secret on Earth.

Development for the film began in 1992, after producers Walter F. Parkes and Laurie MacDonald optioned the rights to the comic book series.
Solomon was soon hired to write the screenplay; Sonnenfeld was the preferred directorial choice, which resulted in delays due to his commitments to other film projects and failure to secure any alternative directors. Principal photography began in March 1996 and lasted until that June, with filming primarily taking place in New York City. Produced by Columbia Pictures and Amblin Entertainment, the film's visual effects were helmed by Industrial Light & Magic. The film's soundtrack contained the theme song of the same name, performed by Smith.

Men in Black premiered at Pacific's Cinerama Dome in Hollywood on June 25, 1997, and was theatrically released in the United States by Sony Pictures Releasing on July 2. It received critical acclaim for its screenplay, action sequences, and the performances and chemistry of Jones and Smith. The film grossed over $589.4 million worldwide, becoming the third-highest-grossing film of 1997 and the ninth-highest-grossing film of the decade. It won for Best Makeup and was also nominated for Best Art Direction and Best Original Score at the 70th Academy Awards, among numerous other accolades. The sequel, Men in Black II, was released in 2002.

Plot

At the Mexico–United States border, two men in black suits, Agent K and Agent D, interrupt a border patrol sting. They take one of the men attempting to cross the border, who is an extraterrestrial in disguise. When it tries to attack one of the patrol officers, K is forced to shoot it and erase the memories of everyone in the group, creating a cover story of an explosion in an underground gas pipeline. Deciding that he is too old to continue working, D chooses to retire and has K erase his memory.

NYPD officer James Darrell Edwards III catches an unnaturally agile fleeing criminal and sees his eyes blink unusually before he leaps from the roof of the Guggenheim Museum. During his interrogation, K arrives and scouts James as a potential new partner, impressed by his ability to chase down an alien. K explains to James that their organization, the Men in Black, was founded after first contact was made with aliens in 1961; at this time Earth was established as a politically neutral zone for alien refugees.

The MIB is a secret organization that monitors and polices these aliens and uses neuralyzers to erase the memories of anyone who witnesses alien activities. James agrees to join, taking a new identity as Agent J, and his civilian identity is erased from government records.

Meanwhile, an alien crash-lands in upstate New York, kills a farmer named Edgar, and begins wearing his skin as a disguise. J and K investigate the crash site and discover this alien is a "bug," an extremely dangerous, cockroach-like species. The bug kills two disguised aliens, who are sent to a police morgue overseen by coroner Laurel Weaver. J and K inspect the bodies, and J and Laurel accidentally open the head of one, revealing a small, injured alien in a control cockpit. The alien tells them "To prevent war, the galaxy is on Orion's belt." before dying.

K neuralyzes Laurel and tells J that the other dead alien, Rosenberg, was a member of the Arquillian royal family. They question an informant, Frank the Pug, who explains that Rosenberg was the guardian of a galaxy that is a precious source of sub-atomic energy; the bug killed Rosenberg to acquire it so the bugs may destroy the Arquillians. Frank also tells them that the galaxy is on Earth and is very small. An Arquillian warship enters Earth's orbit, issuing an ultimatum to MIB to give them the galaxy.

J deduces the galaxy is in a jewel on the collar of Rosenberg's cat, Orion, which is in Laurel's care. The bug reaches the same conclusion and arrives at the morgue first; it seizes and swallows the galaxy and flees with Laurel. The Arquillians, who are willing to destroy the galaxy rather than let the bugs have it, warn MIB that they will destroy Earth in one hour unless the galaxy is returned.

With all other transports locked down, J realizes the bug's only escape is the observation towers of the New York State Pavilion at Flushing Meadows, which was built for the 1964 New York World's Fair to disguise two real flying saucers. The bug attempts to take off, but J and K shoot down the ship, and the bug sheds Edgar's skin to reveal its true form while expanding greatly in size. It swallows J and K's guns, and K goads it to swallow him as well. The bug begins to board the second ship. J steps on cockroaches from a dumpster to antagonize it, stalling it until K finds his gun in its stomach and shoots it from inside. The remains of the bug attack the two, but Laurel destroys it with J's gun.

After recovering the galaxy from the bug's remains, K admits to J that he is ready to retire from MIB and has been training J as a replacement rather than a partner. After bidding each other farewell, J neuralyzes K, creating a cover story that he was in a coma for 35 years. Laurel joins MIB as J's new partner, Agent L. The entire Milky Way galaxy proves to be contained within a marble that a giant alien is using to play a game.

Cast
 Tommy Lee Jones as Kevin Brown / Agent K: J's grizzled and humorless mentor. The studio wanted Clint Eastwood for the part, while Jones only accepted the role after Steven Spielberg promised the script would improve, based on his respect for Spielberg's track record. He had been disappointed with the first draft, which he reportedly said "stank", feeling it did not capture the tone of the comic.
 Will Smith as James Darrell Edwards III / Agent J: A former NYPD detective, newly recruited to the MIB. Smith was cast because Barry Sonnenfeld's wife was a fan of The Fresh Prince of Bel-Air. Sonnenfeld also liked his performance in Six Degrees of Separation. The studio preferred Chris O'Donnell for the role, fresh off his portrayal of Dick Grayson, whom he played in Batman Forever and Batman & Robin, and Spielberg told Sonnenfeld to take him to dinner to convince him to do it. However, Sonnenfeld got him to not accept the role by saying that he was not a good director and that the script was one O'Donnell should skip. David Schwimmer also turned down the part. Like Jones, Smith said he accepted the role after meeting with Spielberg and cited his success as a producer.
 Linda Fiorentino as Dr. Laurel Weaver / Agent L: A deputy medical examiner, and later J's partner.
 Vincent D'Onofrio as Edgar / The Bug: A farmer who is killed and eaten by a giant alien insect, which then wears his skin in order to search for the Galaxy and destroy the Arquillians. John Turturro and Bruce Campbell were both offered the role, but they turned it down due to scheduling conflicts.
 Rip Torn as Chief Zed: The head of the MIB.
 Tony Shalhoub as Jack Jeebs: An alien arms dealer who runs a pawn shop as a front.
 Siobhan Fallon Hogan as Beatrice: Edgar's abused wife.
 Mike Nussbaum as Gentle Rosenberg: An Arquillian royal family member, posing as a jeweler, who is the guardian of "the Galaxy".
 Jon Gries as Nick the van driver: the American smuggler who unknowingly carries a literal alien among his posse.
 Sergio Calderón as Jose
 John Alexander as Mikey: An alien who poses as a Mexican being smuggled across the border.
 Patrick Breen as Mr. Redgick
 Becky Ann Baker as Mrs. Redgick
 Carel Struycken as Arquillian
 Fredric Lehne as Agent Janus
 Kent Faulcon as 2nd Lieutenant Jake Jensen
 Richard Hamilton as Agent D: K's former partner who retires after deciding he is too old for the job.
 David Cross as Newton, Morgue Attendant 
 Sean Whalen as Passport Officer
 Verne Troyer as the Alien son

Voices/Puppeteers
 Tim Blaney as Frank the Pug: A smart-talking pug-like alien.
 Mark Setrakian as Rosenberg Alien
 Brad Abrell, Thom Fountain, Carl J. Johnson, and Drew Massey as the Worm Guys: A quartet of worm-like aliens that work for Men in Black.

Production

Development
The film is loosely based on Lowell Cunningham and Sandy Carruthers's comic book The Men in Black. Producers Walter F. Parkes and Laurie MacDonald optioned the rights to The Men in Black in 1992, and hired Ed Solomon to write a very faithful script. Parkes and MacDonald wanted Barry Sonnenfeld as director because he had helmed the darkly humorous The Addams Family and its sequel Addams Family Values. However, Sonnenfeld was attached to Get Shorty (1995), so they instead approached Les Mayfield (best known for his remake of Miracle on 34th Street). Mayfield was briefly attached before it fell through. John Landis and Quentin Tarantino were asked to direct but each declined. As a result, Men in Black was delayed so as to allow Sonnenfeld to make it his next project after Get Shorty.

Much of the initial script drafts were set underground, with locations ranging from Kansas to Washington, D.C. and Nevada. Sonnenfeld decided to change the location to New York City, because the director felt New Yorkers would be tolerant of aliens who behaved oddly while disguised, terming the movie as "The French Connection with aliens". He also felt much of the city's structures resembled flying saucers and rocket ships. One of the locations Sonnenfeld thought perfect for the movie was a giant ventilation structure for the Brooklyn–Battery Tunnel, which became the outside of the MIB headquarters.

Filming
Principal photography began in March 1996. Many last-minute changes ensued during production. First, the scene where James Edwards chasing a disguised alien was to be filmed at Lincoln Center, but the New York Philharmonic decided to charge the filmmakers for using their buildings, prompting Sonnenfeld to film the scene at the Solomon R. Guggenheim Museum instead. Then, five months into the shoot, Sonnenfeld decided that the original ending, with a humorous existential debate between Agent J and the Bug, was unexciting and lacking the action that the rest of the film had. Five potential replacements were discussed. One of these had Laurel Weaver being neuralyzed and K remaining an agent. Eventually it boiled down to the Bug eating K and fighting J, replacing the animatronic Bug Rick Baker's crew had developed with a computer-generated Bug with an appearance closer to a cockroach. The whole action sequence cost an extra $4.5 million to the filmmakers.

Further changes were made during post-production to simplify the plotline involving the possession of the tiny galaxy. The Arquillians would hand over the galaxy to the Baltians, ending a long war. The Bugs need to feed on the casualties and steal the galaxy in order to continue the war. Through changing of subtitles, the images on M.I.B.'s main computer and Frank the Pug's dialogue, the Baltians were eliminated from the plot. Earth goes from being potentially destroyed in the crossfire between the two races into being possibly destroyed by the Arquillians themselves to prevent the Bugs from getting the galaxy. These changes to the plot were carried out when only two weeks remained in the film's post-production, but the film's novelization still contains the Baltians.

Design and visual effects
Production designer Bo Welch designed the MIB headquarters with a 1960s tone in mind, because that was when their organization was formed. He cited influences from Finnish architect Eero Saarinen, who designed a terminal at John F. Kennedy International Airport. As the arrival point of aliens on Earth, Welch felt the headquarters had to resemble an airport.

Rick Baker was approached to provide the prosthetic and animatronic aliens, many of whom would have more otherworldly designs instead of looking humanoid. For example, the reveal of Gentle Rosenberg's Arquillian nature went from a man with a light under his neck's skin to a small alien hidden inside a human head. Baker would describe Men in Black as the most complex production in his career, "requiring more sketches than all my previous movies together". Baker had to have approval from both Sonnenfeld and Spielberg: "It was like, 'Steven likes the head on this one and Barry really likes the body on this one, so why don't you do a mix and match?' And I'd say, because it wouldn't make any sense." Sonnenfeld also changed a lot of the film's aesthetic during pre-production: "I started out saying aliens shouldn't be what humans perceive them to be. Why do they need eyes? So Rick did these great designs, and I'd say, 'That's great — but how do we know where he's looking?' I ended up where everyone else did, only I took three months." The maquettes built by Baker's team would later be digitized by Industrial Light & Magic, who was responsible for the visual effects and computer-generated imagery, for more mobile digital versions of the aliens.

Music

Two different soundtracks for the film were released: a score soundtrack featuring music composed by Danny Elfman and an album of songs used in and inspired by the film, featuring Will Smith's original song "Men in Black" based on the film's plot.

Elfman's music was called "rousing" by the Los Angeles Times. Variety called the film a technical marvel, giving special credit to "Elfman's always lively score." Elfman was nominated for Best Original Musical or Comedy Score at the 70th Academy Awards for his score.

Elfman recalled in 2017 how he was chosen to compose the soundtrack as "strange." He was on the set of The Frighteners with Peter Jackson when D'Onofrio, who was shooting Men In Black on the other set, walked in and invited both men to watch him perform the final scene. Then on the way home, Elfman got a call from his agent saying that he was hired to compose the soundtrack, even though there was no discussion about it prior.

Elvis Presley's song "Promised Land" is featured in the scene where the MIB's car runs on the ceiling of Queens–Midtown Tunnel.

Release

Marketing
In advance of the film's theatrical release, its marketing campaign included more than 30 licensees. Galoob was the first to license, in which they released various action figures of the film's characters and aliens. Ray-Ban also partnered the film with a $5–10 million television campaign. Other promotional items included Hamilton Watches and Procter & Gamble's Head & Shoulders with the tagline "Keeping the Men in Black in black".

An official comic adaptation was released by Marvel Comics. The film also received a third-person shooter Men in Black game developed by Gigawatt Studios and published by Gremlin Interactive, which was released to lackluster reviews in October 1997 for the PC and the following year for the PlayStation. Also, a very rare promotional PlayStation video game system was released in 1997 with the Men in Black logo on the CD lid. Three months after the film's release, an animated series based on Men in Black, produced by Columbia TriStar Television alongside Adelaide Productions and Amblin Television, began airing on The WB's Kids' WB programming block, and also inspired several games. A Men in Black role-playing game was also released in 1997 by West End Games.

Home media
Men in Black was first released on a THX certified VHS in standard and widescreen formats on November 25, 1997. A LaserDisc version was released that same day. The home video release was attached to a rebate offer on a pair of Ray-Ban Predator-model sunglasses. The film was re-released in a collector's series on VHS and DVD on September 5, 2000, with the DVD containing several bonus features including an interactive editing workshop for three different scenes from the film, extended storyboards, conceptual art, and a visual commentary track with Tommy Lee Jones and director Barry Sonnenfeld; an alternate two-disc version was also released that had a fullscreen version on the first disc. The Deluxe Edition was also released on DVD in 2002. A Blu-ray edition was released on June 17, 2008. The entire Men in Black trilogy was released on 4K Ultra HD Blu-ray on December 5, 2017, in conjunction with the film's 20th anniversary.

Reception

Box office
Men in Black earned $4.8 million from Tuesday night previews and went on to gross $14 million on its opening day, bringing the total gross to $18.8 million. During its opening weekend, it generated $51.1 million, making it the third-highest opening weekend of all time, behind Batman Forever and The Lost World: Jurassic Park. The film then grossed $84.1 million during its five-day Wednesday opening. It surpassed Independence Day for having three records. These were the biggest three-day Fourth of July opening weekend, the largest July opening weekend and the highest opening weekend for a non-sequel film. The film would hold the latter two records for three years until 2000 when X-Men took them. Two years later, its successor Men in Black II broke the record for having the highest three-day Fourth of July opening weekend. Moreover, Men in Black held the record for having the highest opening weekend for an action-packed comedy film until Rush Hour 2 surpassed it in 2001. It would remain in the number one spot at the box office for three weeks until it was beaten by Air Force One. The film also competed against Hercules and Batman & Robin during its theatrical run.

Men in Black grossed $250.6 million in the United States and Canada, and $338.7 million in other territories, for a worldwide total of $589.3 million. It would hold the record for being the highest-grossing Sony film until it was surpassed by Spider-Man five years later in 2002. The film grossed a record $10.7 million in its opening weekend in Germany, beating the record held by Independence Day.

Despite its grosses, writer Ed Solomon has said that Sony claims the film has never turned a profit, which is attributed to Hollywood accounting.

Critical response
On review aggregation website Rotten Tomatoes, Men in Black holds an approval rating of 91% based on 92 reviews, and an average score of 7.50/10. The site's critical consensus reads "Thanks to a smart script, spectacular set pieces, and charismatic performances from its leads, Men in Black is an entirely satisfying summer blockbuster hit." On Metacritic, the film has a weighted average score of 71 out of 100, based on 22 critics, indicating "generally favorable reviews". Audiences polled by CinemaScore gave the film an average grade of "B+" on an A+ to F scale.

Gene Siskel of the Chicago Tribune gave the film three-and-a-half stars out of four, praising the film as "a smart, funny and hip adventure film in a summer of car wrecks and explosions." Roger Ebert of the Chicago Sun-Times gave the film three stars out of four, giving particular praise to the film's self-reflective humor and Rick Baker's alien creature designs. Janet Maslin, reviewing for The New York Times, wrote the film "is actually a shade more deadpan and peculiar than such across-the-board marketing makes it sound. It's also extraordinarily ambitious, with all-star design and special-effects talent and a genuinely artful visual style. As with his Addams Family films and Get Shorty, which were more overtly funny than the sneakily subtle Men in Black, Mr. Sonnenfeld takes offbeat genre material and makes it boldly mainstream."

Writing for Variety, Todd McCarthy acknowledged the film was "witty and sometimes surreal sci-fi comedy" in which he praised the visual effects, Baker's creature designs and Elfman's musical score. However, he felt the film "doesn't manage to sustain this level of inventiveness, delight and surprise throughout the remaining two-thirds of the picture." Owen Gleiberman of Entertainment Weekly graded the film a C+, writing "Men in Black celebrates the triumph of attitude over everything else – plausibility, passion, any sense that what we're watching actually matters. The aliens, for all their slimy visual zest, aren't particularly scary or funny (they aren't allowed to become characters), and so the joke of watching Smith and Jones crack wise in their faces quickly wears thin." John Hartl of The Seattle Times, claimed the film "is moderately amusing, well-constructed and mercifully short, but it fails to deliver on the zaniness of its first half." While he was complimentary of the film's first half, he concluded "somewhere around the midpoint they run out of energy and invention. Even the aliens, once they stop their shape-shifting ways and settle down to appear as themselves, begin to look familiar."

Accolades
Men in Black won the Academy Award for Best Makeup, and was also nominated for Best Original Musical or Comedy Score and Best Art Direction, losing the latter two awards to The Full Monty and Titanic simultaneously. It was also nominated for the Golden Globe Award for Best Motion Picture - Musical or Comedy.

On Empire magazine's list of the 500 Greatest Movies of All Time, "Men in Black" placed 409th. Following the film's release, Ray-Ban stated sales of their Predator 2 sunglasses (worn by the organization to deflect neuralyzers) tripled to $5 million.

Year-end lists
American Film Institute Lists
 AFI's 100 Years...100 Laughs - Nominated
 AFI's 100 Years...100 Heroes and Villains:
 Agent J & Agent K - Nominated Heroes
 AFI's 100 Years...100 Songs:
 "Men in Black" - Nominated
 AFI's 100 Years...100 Movie Quotes:
 "You know the difference between you and me? I make this look good." - Nominated
 AFI's 10 Top 10 - Nominated Science Fiction Film

Sequels

See also

 List of films featuring extraterrestrials

References

External links

 
 

1990s buddy cop films
1990s buddy comedy films
1990s English-language films
1997 films
1997 science fiction films
1990s science fiction action films
1990s science fiction comedy films
1990s monster movies
1997 action comedy films
African-American action films
African-American comedy films
American action comedy films
American buddy cop films
American science fiction action films
American science fiction comedy films
American monster movies
Amblin Entertainment films
Columbia Pictures films
Fictional-language films
Films about extraterrestrial life
Films about insects
Films adapted into television shows
Films based on American comics
Films directed by Barry Sonnenfeld
Films with screenplays by Ed Solomon
Films produced by Walter F. Parkes
Films scored by Danny Elfman
Films set in 1997
Films set in New York City
Films shot in New Jersey
Films shot in New York City
Films that won the Academy Award for Best Makeup
Men in Black (franchise)
1990s American films